Ankazoabo is a district in Atsimo-Andrefana Region, Madagascar. 10700 ha of the district are cultivated. An airport serves within the district.

Communes
The district is further divided into five communes:

 Andranomafana
 Ankazoabo
 Ántevamena
 Berenty
 Tandrano

References

Populated places in Atsimo-Andrefana